Scrapper may refer to:

Film and television
 The Scrapper, a 1917 short Western film directed by John Ford
 Scrappers, a 2010 feature documentary film
 Scrappers, a 2010 reality television show on Spike TV
 Scrapper (2011 film), a short film
 Scrapper (2023 film), a British film
 Scrapper (2013), an independent film starring Michael Beach, Anna Giles and Aidan Gillen

Fictional characters
 Scrapper (Transformers), several Transformers characters
 Scrapper Griswell, a character in the comic strip Striker
 Scrapper, a cat in the animated TV series Mr. Bean
 Scrapper Smith, one of Lord Snooty's Pals in the Beano

Other uses
 Someone who collects and sells scrap
 Someone who illegally collects and sells metal as scrap; see Metal theft
 A scrapbooker
 Scrapper Records, a record label of Pete Francis Heimbold
 Scrapper Blackwell, 1903–1962, American blues guitarist and singer
 Scrappers, a role-playing game by Privateer Press
 Mahoning Valley Scrappers, a minor league baseball club based in Niles, Ohio, USA
 Nashville Scrappers, the sports team of Nashville High School in Nashville, Arkansas, US

See also